2010 HKFC International Soccer Sevens, officially known as IP Global HKFC International Soccer 7s due to sponsorship reason, is the 11th staging of this competition. It was held on 14–16 May 2010.

Notable players

Masters Tournament
 Andy Cole Jura All Stars: Andy Cole, David May, Lee Martin, Clayton Blackmore, Andy Ritchie, Michael Thomas, Ugo Ehiogu, Ian Walker, Frank Sinclair
 Southampton Lloyds TSB All Stars: Ian Baird

Main Tournament
 Ajax: Nathaniël Will, Vlatko Lazić
 Aston Villa: Benjamin Siegrist, Ciaran Clark, James Collins, Harry Forrester, Marc Albrighton, Andreas Weimann, Nathan Delfouneso, Durrell Berry
 Birmingham City: Jack Butland, Fraser Kerr, Dan Preston, Luke Rowe, Luke Hubbins, Ashley Sammons, Jake Jervis, Jordon Mutch, Brice Ntambwe
 Eastleigh FC: Brett Williams
 Celtic F.C.: Danielle Giordano, Richie Towell, Matty Hughes, Declan Gallagher, Jason Lowdon, James Keatings, Sean Fitzharris, Paul Slane, Callum McGregor
 Rangers F.C.: Andrew Shinnie (Tournament Top Scorer), Scott Gallacher, Andrew Mitchell, Ross Perry, Rhys McCabe, Stephen Stirling, Rory Loy, Dylan McGeouch, Max Wright, Kal Naismith
 West Ham United: Sam Cowler, Cristian Montano, Olly Lee, Anthony Edgar, Luca Maoni, Jordan Spence, Eoin Wearen, Nicky Barrett, Jordan Brown, Callum McNaughton, Ahmed Abdulla

Masters Tournament – Group Stage

Group A

Group B

Group C

Group D

Masters Tournament – Knockout Stage

Except the quarter-final between IP Global All Stars and Andy Cole Jura All Stars which was held on 15 May, all other matches of the Knockout stage were held on 16 May 2010.

Plate
 Bottom two teams of each group entered the quarter-finals of Plate.

Cup
 Top two teams of each group entered the quarter-finals of Cup.

Main Tournament – Group Stage

Group A

Group B

Group C

Group D

Main Tournament – Knockout Stage

Knockout stage was held on 16 May 2010.

Plate
 Bottom two teams of each group entered the quarter-finals of Plate.

Shield
 Losing teams of Cup quarter-finals entered the semi-finals of Shield.

Cup
 Top two teams of each group entered the quarter-finals of Cup.

Prize Winners
 Masters Tournament – Plate: Team Bondi
 Masters Tournament – Cup: Kokusai FC Tokyo
 Main Tournament – Plate: Eastleigh FC
 Main Tournament – Shield: Ajax
 Main Tournament – Cup: Aston Villa
 Player of the Tournament: Andrew Shinnie (Rangers)

References

Hong
HKFC International Soccer Sevens